Avalonnectes is an extinct genus of small-bodied rhomaleosaurid known from the Early Jurassic period (most likely earliest Hettangian stage) of the United Kingdom. It contains a single species, A. arturi.

Discovery
Avalonnectes is known from the holotype specimen NHMUK 14550, which consists of the posterior portion of a skull, and a nearly complete, three-dimensionally preserved and articulated postcranial skeleton. Another partial postcranial skeleton which was referred to it is AGT uncatalogued. Both specimens were collected at Street, of Somerset, from the Pre-Planorbis beds of the Blue Lias Formation of the Lower Lias Group. These beds likely occur below the first occurrence of the ammonite Psiloceras planorbis. Thus, they probably fall within the earliest Hettangian P. tilmanni Chronozone, which is about 199.6-198 million years old, immediately following the Triassic–Jurassic Boundary. Plesiosaurs fossils which were discovered at Street represent the earliest known occurrence of the Plesiosauria. Hence, Avalonnectes is one of the oldest plesiosaurs to date.

Description
The number of dorsal vertebrae are about 18–19; this low number represents its autapomorphy.

Classification
A phylogenetic analysis performed by Benson et al. (2012) found it to be a basal rhomaleosaurid. The cladogram below shows Avalonnectes phylogenetic position among other plesiosaurs following Benson et al. (2012).

Etymology
Avalonnectes was first described and named by Roger B. J. Benson, Mark Evans and Patrick S. Druckenmiller in 2012 and the type species is Avalonnectes arturi. The generic name is derived from Avalon, an island from the legend of King Arthur, often identified with Glastonbury, near Street, and from Greek nectes, meaning "swimmer". The specific name honors the paleontologist Arthur Cruickshank (1932–2011), who with M. A. Taylor initiated the restudy of British Lower Jurassic plesiosaurians in the 1990s. It is also a reference to the legendary King Arthur of British folklore.

See also

 Timeline of plesiosaur research
 List of plesiosaur genera

References

Early Jurassic plesiosaurs of Europe
Fossil taxa described in 2012
Fossils of Great Britain
Rhomaleosaurids
Sauropterygian genera